Preventive detention is an imprisonment that is putatively justified for non-punitive purposes, most often to prevent (further) criminal acts.

Types of preventive detention
There is no universally agreed definition of preventive detention, and multiple types of detention are sometimes considered a form of preventive detention.

Usually, preventive detention is the detention of a convicted criminal who has served their sentence, but is considered too dangerous to release. In that case, the detention is considered "preventive" in that it is not intended to punish or deter the criminal, but to prevent the criminal from committing further crimes and/or also protect the public.

This article focuses on both this type of preventive detention and detention of a person without trial or conviction by a court. Its purpose is to not to punish a person for their past offences, but to prevent him from committing an offence in the near future.

Remand or pre-trial detention (detention of a suspected criminal prior to trial) and involuntary commitment (detention of people considered a risk to themselves or others due to mental illness) are sometimes considered a form of preventive detention. For example, in Peru, remand is called "prisión preventiva", literally "preventive prison (detention)".

Specific jurisdictions

Australia
Australia laws authorize preventive detention in a variety of circumstances. For example, mandatory detention in Australia (a form of immigration detention) is applied to asylum seekers who arrive in Australian territorial waters or territory, until their status as an asylum seeker is established.

In Australia's most populous state, New South Wales, preventive detention regimes have established powers to detain or to continuously monitor and limit particular activities of those who were once convicted of various serious sexual and violent offences. Recently, this has been extended, with the State government now able to control the free movement, speech, association and work of individuals and businesses via Serious Crime Prevention Orders (‘SCPOs’). Based on provisions in the United Kingdom, a range of state officials may apply to the NSW District or Supreme Courts to create an SCPO consisting of any conditions they consider appropriate. These conditions may include positive obligations - such as an obligation to report to a police station - or negative ‘prohibitions’ or ‘restrictions’, for instance, a prohibition on travelling beyond a certain location. Failure to comply with the SCPO, carries with it a maximum penalty of five years’ imprisonment.

SCPOs have been described as a "watershed extension of state power in New South Wales" by legal academics, and were strongly opposed by the legal community when they were introduced and passed into law with less than two weeks' consideration by the Parliament of NSW.

Costa Rica
In Costa Rica, the 1998 Criminal Proceedings Code allows for a normal pre-trial "prisión preventiva" or remand of 12 months if the person is considered a "flight risk", but if the case is declared "complex", it can be increased to up to three years and a half of imprisonment without conviction, or even more in some cases. As of 23 May 2013, over 3,000 people were in pre-trial detention.

Denmark
In connection to riots or other situations where there is a safety risk to the general public, the police can detain a person for up to twelve hours without involving the courts. Until 2009, the limit was six hours. This change was part of the so-called Lømmelpakke (da), a law package that also included other changes, notably a higher punishment for preventing the work of the police.

Germany
In Germany, "preventive detention" (German: Sicherungsverwahrung, [https://www.gesetze-im-internet.de/englisch_stgb/englisch_stgb.html#StGBengl_000P66 §66 Strafgesetzbuch) has a similar meaning to that in New Zealand. Sicherungsverwahrung can only be imposed as part of a criminal sentence, and it is handed down to individuals who have committed a grave offence and are considered a danger to public safety. It is an indeterminate sentence that follows a regular jail sentence. To assure the suitability of the preventive detention, it has to be reviewed every two years to determine the ongoing threat posed by the individual. Preventive detention is typically served in regular prisons, though separated from regular prisoners and with certain privileges.

The Sicherungsverwahrung is usually imposed in the original verdict, but can be imposed later under certain circumstances. This practice of subsequent incapacitation orders was ruled a violation of Art 7 of the European Convention on Human Rights by the European Court of Human Rights. Subsequently, a huge discussion in Germany over the handling of this verdict occurred. In reaction to this the Federal Constitutional Court of Germany issued a verdict on Sicherungsverwahrung in May 2011, deeming it unconstitutional. In response, a new law regulating Sicherungsverwahrung was passed in November 2012.

India

In India, preventive detention is for a maximum period of three months, a limit which can be changed by the Parliament. According to Preventive Detention Act 1950, it can be extended beyond three months up to a total of twelve months, only on the favourable recommendation of an advisory board, made up of High Court judges or persons eligible to be appointed High Court judges.

Preventive detention in India dates from British rule in the early 1800s, and continued with such laws as the Defence of India Act, 1939 and the Preventive Detention Act 1950.

The controversial Maintenance of Internal Security Act was originally enacted by the Indian parliament early during Indira Gandhi's prime ministership in 1971. However it was amended several times during "The Emergency" (1975–1977), leading to human rights violations. It was subsequently repealed after Indira Gandhi lost the election in 1977, and the new government took over.

India's National Security Act of 1980 empowers the Central Government and State Governments to detain a person to prevent him/her from acting in any manner prejudicial to the security of India, the relations of India with foreign countries, the maintenance of public order, or the maintenance of supplies and services essential to the community it is necessary so to do. The act also gives power to the governments to detain a foreigner in a view to regulate his presence or expel from the country. The act was passed in 1980 during the Indira Gandhi Government. The maximum period of detention is 12 months. The order can also be made by the District Magistrate or a Commissioner of Police under their respective jurisdictions, but the detention should be reported to the State Government along with the grounds on which the order has been made. The National Security Act along with other laws allowing preventive detention have come under wide criticism for their alleged misuse. The act's constitutional validity even during peacetime has been described by some sections as an anachronism.

Japan

In Japan, pre-trial detention of a suspect can be for up to 23 days without charge. The length of detention, up to the maximum period, is at the discretion of the public prosecutor and subject to the approval of local courts. It can also be further extended.

Malaysia
In Malaysia the Internal Security Act 1960 (ISA) was a preventive detention law that was enacted after Malaysia gained independence from Britain in 1957. The ISA allowed for detention without trial or criminal charges under limited, legally defined circumstances. The ISA was invoked against terrorism activity and against anyone deemed a threat to national security. On 15 September 2011, Najib Razak, the then Prime Minister of Malaysia, said that this legislation would be repealed and replaced by two new laws.

On 17 April 2012, the Security Offences (Special Measures) Act 2012 (SOSMA) was approved by the Malaysian Parliament as a replacement for the ISA. It was given the Royal Assent on 18 June 2012 and gazetted on 22 June 2012.

New Zealand

New Zealand has two types of preventive detention. The one called "preventive detention" is an indeterminate sentence of imprisonment. The other is called a "public protection order" and is a civil detention.

"Preventive detention" is an indeterminate sentence of imprisonment, similar to life imprisonment and second only to it in terms of seriousness. It may be given to offenders aged 18 or over who are convicted of a qualifying sexual or violent offence, and the court is satisfied that the person is likely to commit another qualifying sexual or violent offence if they were given a determinate sentence of imprisonment.  Preventive detention has a minimum non-parole period of five years in prison, but the sentencing judge can extend this if they believe that the prisoner's history warrants it. A total of 314 people were serving terms of preventive detention in 2013, of whom 34 were on parole. Alfred Thomas Vincent was in prison on preventive detention for 52 years from 1968 to 2021.

A public protection order is a civil detention order for someone who has finished a finite prison sentence and still poses a very high risk of serious sexual or violent reoffending. The person is detained in a secure civil residence inside the perimeter of a prison.

Peru 
In Peru, "preventive prison" has been used extensively by local courts and the National Court of Peru. Such uses have imprisoned and led to the sentencing of various prominent political figures perceived to have committed illicit acts of corruption in Peru. Over 30 prominent political figures in Peru have been detained as per order of preventive detention, including five presidents and one presidential candidate.

The continuation of using preventive detention as a means of justice is currently being debated amongst the legislative and executive powers of Peru.

Singapore 
In Singapore, preventive detention is considered as a special type of imprisonment reserved for recalcitrant offenders aged at least 30 years old and have at least three previous convictions since turning 16, and this detention order, which may last between seven to 20 years, do not allow the usual one-third remission of sentence for good behaviour. It is divided into three stages: the first is prison life, the second is prison life with labour, and the third is rigorous industrial and social training to rehabilitate the detainees. Usually, it was used by the courts of Singapore to cage any offenders who were recalcitrant and deemed a threat to society, with a purpose to isolate them for the protection of society as long as possible.

An alternative order of preventive detention is also used by the Internal Security Act to detain any individuals who pose a threat to Singapore's national security.

One notable case was convicted child abuser Chong Keng Chye (aged 37 in 2004), who had several past convictions for cheating and violent crimes since age 16, was sentenced in 2004 to the maximum of 20 years' preventive detention and nine strokes of the cane for severely abusing a seven-year-old boy to death in 1999, as well as for several cheating offences in 2003. In another case, Rosli Yassin (aged 52 in 2012), who went in and out of prison since 1991, was sentenced in 2012 to 12 years' preventive detention for culpable homicide and cheating, before the detention order was increased to 20 years upon the prosecution's appeal. Drug trafficker Abdul Kahar Othman was previously serving ten years of preventive detention from 1995 to 2005 due to his long criminal record of drug offences, before he was caught and later executed in 2022 for a 2010 drug trafficking crime.

South Africa 
Under Apartheid, the government of South Africa used preventive detention laws to target its political opponents. These included, notably, the Terrorism Act of 1967, which gave police commanders the power to detain terrorists—or people with information about terrorists—without warrant.

United Kingdom 
England and Wales used to have provisions, introduced by the Labour Government in 2003, to deal with dangerous offenders similar to what is used in Canada. However, the Legal Aid, Sentencing and Punishment of Offenders Act 2012 abolished what was called Imprisonment for Public Protection (IPP) without replacement, although offences committed prior to the coming into force of the 2012 Act may still trigger IPP.

United States
In the United States, the Sixth Amendment to the United States Constitution guarantees the right to "a speedy and public trial". Thus, arrested persons may not be held for extended periods of time without trial.

However, since the passage of the National Defense Authorization Act for Fiscal Year 2012 (NDAA), controversy has broken out as to whether or not the U.S. government now has the power to indefinitely detain citizens. Section 1021 and 1022 of the legislation enacted policies described by The Guardian as allowing indefinite detention "without trial [of] American terrorism suspects arrested on U.S. soil who could then be shipped to Guantánamo Bay".

Convicted persons can be held indefinitely as a "dangerous offender".

See also 
 Administrative detention
 Anti-Terrorism Act 2005 (Australia)
 Arbitrary arrest and detention
 Civil confinement
 Criminal Law (Temporary Provisions) Act (Singapore)
 Indefinite imprisonment
 Internal Security Act (Singapore)
 Pre-crime
 Preemptive arrest
 Xinjiang "re-education" camps

References

Imprisonment and detention
Law enforcement in India
Prevention
Statutory law
Terrorism laws

ml:കരുതൽ തടങ്കൽ